Samuel Wood Brooks (29 August 1840 – 9 February 1915) was a missionary and member of the Queensland Legislative Assembly.

Biography
Brooks was born in Beeston, Nottinghamshire, to parents Francis Beattie and his wife Susannah (née Hannah). He attended school in Nottinghamshire and became a Wesleyan Missionary Student by 1863. He did missionary work in Fiji from 1865 but he was found to be having a relationship with a neighboring planter's wife and had to pay his own way back to Sydney in 1875.

In Sydney, Brooks became a private school owner and was a partner in Brentnall Bros and Broola, Merchants in 1880. He came to Brisbane and worked for the Brisbane Telegraph writing for the Brisbane Courier. He became the proprietor of the Queensland Figaro and the Moreton Mail in 1896. He was the Commissioner of the Brisbane Hospital and President of the Queensland Press Association and the Brisbane School of Arts.

On 29 November 1864, he married Hannah Walker (died 1927) in Sydney and together had two sons and one daughter. Brooks died at New Farm, Brisbane in February 1915 and buried in the Toowong Cemetery.

Political career
Brooks was the member for Fortitude Valley in the Queensland Legislative Assembly from 1886 until 1888.

References

Members of the Queensland Legislative Assembly
1840 births
1915 deaths
Burials at Toowong Cemetery
British emigrants to colonial Australia